Methylliberine is an isolate of coffee beans, tea, cola nuts, guarana, cocoa, and yerba mate.

References

Xanthines
Alkaloids
Methoxy compounds